Clara Camarão (fl. 1637) was an indigenous Brazilian and warrior. She was converted to Christianity by the Brazilian Jesuits and baptized Clara Camarão.  During the Dutch invasions in 1630-1637, she led her tribe's warriors in defense of Brazil against the invaders in Goiana and Recife.

References

  «Clara Felipa Camarão (séc. XVII)». Mulher 500. 4 de setembro de 2011.

17th-century Brazilian people
Women in 17th-century warfare
Women in war in South America
Brazilian people of indigenous peoples descent
Indigenous women